Worldweaver Ltd is a training and technology provider, founded in 1997 by Chris Sterling and Simon Dean.

Their first title was a PC-CDROM game Beasts and Bumpkins (1997) published through Electronic Arts.  Since formation they have worked on a wide range of apps and games, including the 3D engine DX Studio, and large scale simulators for classroom training.

In April 2022 new CEO Laura Sterling was appointed and the company now focuses on providing bespoke services and technology for training and learning.

References

External links 
 Official Web Site

Video game companies of the United Kingdom
Video game companies established in 1997
Video game development companies